Alan Henrique Costa (born 30 October 1990) is a Brazilian professional footballer who plays as a defender for Indian Super League club Bengaluru.

Career

Bengaluru
In July 2021, Costa moved to Indian Super League outfit Bengaluru on a two-year loan deal from Avaí. He debuted for the club on 15 August in a 1–0 win over Maldivian side Club Eagles, in 2021 AFC Cup playoffs. He later appeared in all three group stage matches against ATK Mohun Bagan, Bashundhara Kings and Maziya.

He made his Indian Super League debut on 20 November against NorthEast United in a 4–2 win. He scored his first league goal in the next match against Odisha on 24 November, but they lost by 3–1.

Costa made his first appearance of the 2022–23 season on 17 August, in the Durand Cup in a 2–1 win over Jamshedpur at the Kishore Bharati Stadium. On 18 September, he scored the winning goal in the final against Mumbai City in a 2–1 win, which helped Bengaluru win their first Durand Cup title.

Club statistics

Club

Honours 
International
 Campeonato Gaúcho: 2013, 2014, 2015
 Recopa Gaúcha: 2016

Vitória
 Campeonato Baiano: 2017

Avaí
 Campeonato Catarinense: 2021

Bengaluru
 Durand Cup: 2022

References

External links

 
 SC Internacional profile

1990 births
Living people
People from Araraquara
Associação Ferroviária de Esportes players
Association football defenders
Brazilian footballers
Campeonato Brasileiro Série A players
Campeonato Brasileiro Série B players
Esporte Clube São Bento players
Sport Club Internacional players
Esporte Clube Vitória players
Coritiba Foot Ball Club players
Centro Sportivo Alagoano players
Avaí FC players
Bengaluru FC players
Footballers from São Paulo (state)